Hugh Hornby Birley (10 March 1778 – 31 July 1845) was a leading Manchester millowner and Tory who is reputed to have led the fatal charge of the Manchester and Salford Yeomanry at the Peterloo Massacre on 16 August 1819.

Early life 
He was the son of Richard Birley (1743–1812), merchant, who had four sons and four daughters. Hugh's brother, Joseph Birley (1782–1847), was the father of Hugh Birley who served as Member of Parliament for Manchester from 1868 to 1883.

Career 
In 1814 he commenced the building of the Cambridge Street Cotton Mill in Chorlton-on-Medlock. He was a local magistrate and one of the commanders of the Manchester and Salford Yeomanry responsible for the Peterloo Massacre at St Peter's Field in 1819.

He assisted the Swiss inventor-engineer Johann Georg Bodmer by making space available to him at his Chorlton Mills and was instrumental in founding the Royal Victoria Gallery of Practical Science in 1839. He was associated with the Royal Manchester Institution and a moving force in the establishment of Owens College. He was a director of the Manchester Gas Works and became a business associate of Charles Macintosh with the intention of putting the works' waste products to profitable use in the manufacture of waterproof fabrics.

Personal life 
He married Cecily Hornby (1797–1843) of Kirkham, with whom he had four sons, including:
 Joseph Hornby Birley (1827–1881)
Hugh Hornby Birley died in 1845 and was buried in the family vault in St. Peter's Church, Manchester.

Descendants
His nephew was Hugh Birley (1817–1883), a businessman and Conservative politician, and his great-grandson was Oswald Birley (1880–1952), the portrait painter and royal portraitist prominent in the early part of the 20th century.

References

Sources

External links 
 Entry on Birley family genealogy
 Hugh Birley, at Spartacus International

1778 births
1845 deaths
British people of English descent
Businesspeople from Manchester
British Yeomanry officers
Hugh Hornby Birley